Javier Andrés Estupiñán Romero (born 8 February 1984) is a Colombian footballer who plays as a forward for Honduran Liga Nacional club Juticalpa

Career

Early career 
Estupiñan began his playing career in 2004 playing for Deportivo Pasto.  In Deportivo Pasto he did not have much involvement and in the year 2005 he left the club, when he was loaned to Girardot F.C.

Honduras 
He arrived in Honduras to play for Platense F.C.  At Platense he scored 14 goals.  After a few seasons he moved to Parrillas One where he continued to score goals.

Terengganu FA 
He arrived in Terengganu F.C. I with a high expectation from the fans.  But he only scored 2 goals from 5 appearances in the Malaysia Super League.  He has been transfer after a bad season in Terengganu FA

He returned to Honduras ahead of the 2015 Clausura championship when he joined Club Deportivo Olimpia.  In 2018 he signed for city rivals F.C. Motagua.

References

External links
 

1984 births
Living people
Sportspeople from Nariño Department
Association football forwards
Colombian footballers
Deportivo Pasto footballers
Girardot F.C. footballers
Patriotas Boyacá footballers
Atlético Nacional footballers
Chengdu Tiancheng F.C. players
Chinese Super League players
Platense F.C. players
Parrillas One players
Terengganu FC players
C.D. Olimpia players
F.C. Motagua players
Colombian expatriate footballers
Colombian expatriate sportspeople in Malaysia
Expatriate footballers in China
Expatriate footballers in Honduras
Expatriate footballers in Malaysia
Categoría Primera A players
Categoría Primera B players
Liga Nacional de Fútbol Profesional de Honduras players